Art Bowker (born 1961 in Ohio), is an author and cybercrime specialist in corrections (pretrial, probation, and parole).  
His first book, The Cybercrime Handbook for Community Corrections: Managing Risk in the 21st Century, describes the process of supervising cyber-offenders. 
Bowker cowrote his second book, Investigating Internet Crimes, 1st Edition: An Introduction to Solving Crimes in Cyberspace , with Todd G. Shipley. His second book provides step-by-step instructions for investigating Internet crimes, including locating, interpreting, understanding, collecting, and documenting online electronic evidence to benefit investigations.

Career 
Bowker has been interviewed by CrimCast and American Hero's Radio. Bowker is a lifetime member of the High Technology Crime Investigation Association (HTCIA), having served as International President of the organization in 2008.
He has written cybercrime articles that have appeared in the FBI Law Enforcement Bulletin, 
 Federal Probation, the American Probation and Parole Association's Perspectives,
 and numerous other publications. He also writes a regular blog called  The Three C's: Computers, Crime, and Corrections.

On January 14, 2013, Bowker was awarded the APPA Sam Houston State University Award, for work in promoting awareness and knowledge of cybercrime and tools to combat such crimes in the field of community corrections.

On November 22, 2013, he was recognized by the Federal Probation and Pretrial Officers Association (FPPOA) with their top honor, the Richard F. Doyle Award, for having made the most significant achievement in, or contribution to, the Federal Probation & Pretrial Services System or the broader field of corrections. Additionally, Bowker received the Thomas E. Gahl, Line Officer of the Year Award (Great Lakes Region Award), which is named in honor of the only U.S. Probation Officer killed in the line of duty. Both awards centered on his contributions and efforts in managing cybercrime risk.

On August 30, 2016, he was recognized by the High Technology Crime Investigation Association with the HTCIA Lifetime Achievement Award, an annual recognition given to one individual with at least seven years membership, who has made significant contributions to HTCIA goals. Some specific factors considered in bestowing of this top award include evidence of advancing the field of computer investigations and prevention of high tech crimes through education and/or the development of tool(s) and or technique(s) and participation as a Chapter or International officer.

References

External links
 The Three C's (Computers, Crime, and Corrections) Blog

1961 births
American non-fiction crime writers
Cybercrime
Living people